James Arthur Patrick Sullivan (January 19, 1893 – October 7, 1975) was a Canadian professional ice hockey player. He played with the Ottawa Senators of the National Hockey Association during the 1914–15 season.

Sullivan was on the Pittsburgh Yellow Jackets team that won the United States Amateur Hockey Association championship in 1924. In the season that followed, he captained the same league's Fort Pitt Hornets.

He practiced dentistry after retiring from hockey.

References

1893 births
1975 deaths
Canadian ice hockey centres
Fort Pitt Hornets players
Ice hockey people from Ontario
Ottawa Senators (NHA) players
People from the United Counties of Stormont, Dundas and Glengarry
Pittsburgh Yellow Jackets (USAHA) players